Saadi Toma Jirjes (born 25 April 1955) is an Iraqi former football player and coach.

He played during his professional career at Al-Quwa Al-Jawiya and made 10 appearances with the Iraqi national team.
He Al-Quwa Al-Jawiya. He also trained a number of Iraqi and Arab football clubs. and was an assistant coach to both the national and the U-23 football Iraqi squads.

Saadi Toma made headlines by refusing to return to Iraq and applying for asylum in Australia after a match against the Australian U-23 national team.

He returned to Iraq and managed in 2010 as a manager of Zakho FC before resigning indefinitely due to medical reasons.

References 

1955 births
Iraqi football managers
Iraqi Assyrian people
Iraqi footballers
Al-Quwa Al-Jawiya players
Living people
Iraqi Christians
Iraqi emigrants to Australia
Assyrian footballers
Association football forwards